The men's Greco-Roman 57 kilograms at the 1992  Summer Olympics as part of the wrestling program were held at the Institut Nacional d'Educació Física de Catalunya from July 28 to July 30. The wrestlers are divided into 2 groups. The winner of each group decided by a double-elimination system.

Results 
Legend
WO — Won by walkover

Elimination A

Round 1

Round 2

Round 3

Round 4

Round 5

Summary

Elimination B

Round 1

Round 2

Round 3

Round 4

Round 5

Round 6

Summary

Finals

Final standing

References

External links
Official Report

Greco-Roman 57kg